Heikki Partanen (29 January 1942 – 26 November 1990) was a Finnish film director and screenwriter. He directed fifteen films between 1966 and 1989. His 1976 film Antti the Treebranch was entered into the 10th Moscow International Film Festival.

Selected filmography
 Antti the Treebranch (1976)
 Pessi and Illusia (1984)

References

External links

1942 births
1990 deaths
Writers from Helsinki
Finnish film directors
Finnish screenwriters
20th-century screenwriters
1990 suicides
Suicides in Finland